Henry Thomas Givens (12 June 1864 – 19 June 1928) was an Australian politician. He served as a Senator for Queensland from 1904 until his death in 1928 and was President of the Senate from 1913 to 1926. He began his career in the Australian Labor Party (ALP), serving briefly in the Queensland Legislative Assembly (1899–1902), but became a Nationalist after the party split of 1916. He was born in Ireland and worked as a labourer, miner, trade unionist and newspaper editor before entering politics.

Early life
Givens was born on 12 June 1864 in Cappagh White, County Tipperary, Ireland. He was the son of Mary Ann (née White) and Robert Givens, a farmer. He was educated in Ireland at a Catholic primary school, although he was a Protestant. According to one account, he was associated with the Irish National Land League and was gaoled for a period.

Givens emigrated to Australia in 1882, landing at Maryborough, Queensland. He initially worked on the canefields of North Queensland and also spent time in New South Wales and Victoria, "probably as an itinerant bush worker". He then returned to Queensland as a miner, spending 16 years working on the goldfields around Charters Towers. According to a 1910 profile in Punch, Givens also went to Western Australia to participate in the Kimberley gold rush, but "came back wiser and poorer". He helped establish a miners' union at Eidsvold and later became an organiser for the Australian Workers' Union, initially at Charters Towers.

Colonial politics
Givens was a Labour candidate at the 1893 general election, losing to the incumbent attorney-general Thomas Joseph Byrnes in the seat of Cairns. He campaigned on an anti-Kanaka platform. He reprised his candidacy in 1896 and lost by 43 votes.

Givens succeeded on his third attempt, winning Cairns at the 1899 election. He was defeated by James Lyons after a single term in 1902. In parliament, Givens spoke mainly on the sugar industry where he was strongly opposed to the use of "black labour". He proposed that Pacific Islanders be banned from working in factories and within  of a factory.

Federal politics
In 1903, he was elected to the Australian Senate as a Queensland Labor Senator.

On 9 July 1913, he was elected President of the Senate, succeeding his Labor colleague Harry Turley. He left the Labor Party in the wake of the 1916 Labor split over conscription and joined the new Nationalist Party, keeping his position as President of the Senate. On 30 June 1926, he was succeeded as President by John Newlands. His 13 years as President make him the second longest serving President after Alister McMullin.

In March 1917, Givens sued The Age for libel, seeking damages of £5,000. The newspaper had reported Senator David Watson's allegations that Givens had attempted to bribe him to resign. His suit was unsuccessful as it was held that the article in question was a factual account of parliamentary proceedings.

Personal life
Givens married Katie Allen in 1901, with whom he had three sons and three daughters. He died of cardiac disease at his home in Canterbury, Victoria, on 19 June 1928, aged 64. He was granted a state funeral and buried at Box Hill Cemetery. The Queensland Parliament appointed Labor member John MacDonald as his replacement.

References

 

1864 births
1928 deaths
Australian Labor Party members of the Parliament of Australia
Nationalist Party of Australia members of the Parliament of Australia
Members of the Australian Senate for Queensland
Members of the Australian Senate
National Labor Party members of the Parliament of Australia
Australian Labor Party members of the Parliament of Queensland
Members of the Queensland Legislative Assembly
20th-century Australian politicians
Irish emigrants to colonial Australia
Australian miners
Australian newspaper editors
People from County Tipperary